The 1936 United States Senate election in Colorado took place on November 3, 1936. Incumbent Democratic Senator Edward P. Costigan did not seek a second term in office. Democratic Governor Ed Johnson won the open race to succeed him over Raymond L. Sauter.

Primary elections were held September 8. Johnson defeated former Governor William E. Sweet for the Democratic nomination. Sauter was unopposed for the Republican nomination.

Democratic primary

Candidates
Edwin C. Johnson, Governor of Colorado
William E. Sweet, former Governor of Colorado (1923–1925) and candidate for Senate in 1926

Results

Republican primary

Candidates
Raymond L. Sauter

Declined
Larry Phipps, son of former U.S. Senator Lawrence C. Phipps

Results
Sauter was unopposed for the Republican nomination.

General election

Candidates
George W. Carleton (National Union for Social Justice)
Edwin C. Johnson, Governor of Colorado (Democratic)
Ray Sauter (Republican)
Carle Whitehead, perennial candidate (Socialist)

Results

See also 
 1936 United States Senate elections

References 

1936
Colorado
United States Senate